Thomas Morrow (8 October 1923 – 18 June 2002) was an Australian rules footballer in the Victorian Football League (VFL).

Prior to playing with Geelong, Morrow served in the Australian Army during World War II.

See also
 1951 VFL season

References

External links
 
 

Geelong Football Club players
Geelong Football Club Premiership players
Geelong Football Club captains
North Geelong Football Club players
Australian rules footballers from Victoria (Australia)
1923 births
2002 deaths
One-time VFL/AFL Premiership players